Henderson Estates is a residential neighbourhood in south west Edmonton, Alberta, Canada overlooking the North Saskatchewan River valley.  The neighbourhood is bounded on the north by Rabbit Hill Road and on the east by Riverbend Road. The southern boundary is an undeveloped strip of land about 29 Avenue.

According to the 2001 federal census, residential development in the neighbourhood commenced during the 1980s with three out of five (60.3%) of all residences being built during this decade, with the remaining two out of five (39.7%) of the residences being built after 1990.  Additional development in the neighbourhood occurred after completion of the 2001 census.

The most common type of residence in the neighbourhood, according to the 2005 municipal census, is the single-family dwelling.  These account for just over nine out of every ten (92%) of all residences.  The remaining 8% are duplexes.  Virtually all residences in the neighbourhood are owner-occupied, with only three residences being rented.

Demographics 

Surrounding neighbourhoods

References

External links 
 Henderson Estates Neighbourhood Profile

Neighbourhoods in Edmonton